Komisaruk is a surname. Notable people with the surname include:

Barry Komisaruk (born 1941), American sexologist
Katya Komisaruk, American lawyer
Paul Kolton (né Komisaruk; 1923–2010), American writer

See also
 

Ukrainian-language surnames